Zaiton Abdullah (born 2 April 1937) was one of the most popular and talented Malay film actresses in the 1950s and 1960s. Zaiton disappeared from the movie industry when Shaw Brothers studio Jalan Ampas closed down.

Filmography

Film

References

External links
 
 
 

Singaporean film actresses
1936 births
Singaporean people of Malay descent
Singaporean Muslims
Living people
Malay Film Productions contract players